William Charles Nolan (June 10, 1894 – December 6, 1954) was an American animated cartoon writer, animator, director, and artist. He is best known for creating and perfecting the rubber hose style of animation and for streamlining Felix the Cat.

Early life and education
Nolan attended La Salle Academy and Classical High School in Providence, Rhode Island.

Career
Nolan first began his career in 1913 as a newspaper cartoonist, then worked for Raoul Barre and Kings Features until 1918.

He joined the United States Navy in June 1917 at the Navy Recruiting Station at Fort Lafayette, New York. He served at Headquarters, 3rd Naval District in New York and the Brooklyn Naval Hospital, New York. He was discharged in June 1921 as a Chief Yeoman.

From 1924 to 1926, he animated and designed Felix the Cat. He then moved to Winkler to animate on Krazy Kat again. Nolan went to the Walter Lantz Studio from 1929 until 1935, where he animated and briefly voiced Oswald the Lucky Rabbit. Nolan would later leave Lantz to start out Mayfair Productions to produce Skippy cartoons, but only one "The Dog Catcher" was released for United Artists.

Nolan also worked at MGM on The Captain and the Kids series based on the comic strip The Katzenjammer Kids. He then worked with Fleischer Studios where he worked on Popeye and Gulliver's Travels. During World War II, Nolan was in the Navy drawing technical manuals with Timm Aircraft. In 1949, after the war, he formed Willam-Nicholas Productions with Nick Nicholas. He moved his company in 1954 in Madison, Wisconsin, where he died in December.

References

External links

Cartooning Self-Taught by Bill Nolan, published in 1936.

1894 births
1954 deaths
Animators from Connecticut
American animated film directors
La Salle Academy alumni
Metro-Goldwyn-Mayer cartoon studio people
Walter Lantz Productions people
Fleischer Studios people
United States Navy chiefs